Baron Hutchison may refer to:

A subsidiary title of the Earldom of Donoughmore in the Peerage of the United Kingdom
The Baron Hutchison of Montrose, title created in the Peerage of the United Kingdom in 1932 for Robert Hutchison, former MP